Walerian Czuma (24 December 1890 – 7 April 1962) was a Polish general and military commander. He is notable for his command over a Polish unit in Siberia during the Russian Civil War, and the commander of the defence of Warsaw during the siege in 1939.

Biography
At the outbreak of World War I Walerian Czuma joined the Piłsudski's Polish Legions. He was taken POW by the Russian Army and imprisoned in the Butyrka prison. Later he was sentenced to forced resettlement in Siberia. After the Russian Revolution of 1917 he started to organise Polish military units in Siberia, which eventually became known as the Polish 5th Rifle Division.

After the collapse of Kolchak's anti-Bolshevik movement, the Polish 5th Rifle Division, stranded in Siberia, was forced to surrender to the Red Army and Czuma was again imprisoned in Moscow, now Soviet Russia. After the Riga Peace Treaty he was allowed to return to Poland, where he rejoined the Polish Army.

From 1922 he served as the commanding officer of the 19th Infantry Division. Between 1927 and 1928 he was the commander of the Wilno Fortified Area. Later he was the commanding officer of the 5th Division. In March 1938 he was assigned to the Ministry of Internal Affairs as the commanding officer of the Border Guards (Polish Straż Graniczna). Between the wars Czuma was also an active member of several social organisations, among them the Guards of the Graves of Polish Heroes society which initiated the construction of Lwów Eagles mausoleum in Łyczaków Cemetery in Lwów.

After the outbreak of the Polish Defensive War of 1939 he declined to leave Warsaw together with the government and the civilian authorities. On 3 September Marshal of Poland Edward Śmigły-Rydz ordered the creation of an improvised Command of the Defence of Warsaw (Dowództwo Obrony Warszawy) and Czuma became its commander. He commanded all the units fighting in the Siege of Warsaw, for which he was awarded the Virtuti Militari medal.

On 28 September 1939, Czuma was taken POW by the Germans and remained in various POW camps for the rest of World War II. After he was liberated from the Oflag VII-A Murnau POW camp in Murnau am Staffelsee, Germany, by the American forces, he joined the Polish Army in the West. The new Soviet-dominated communist authorities deprived him of Polish citizenship and Czuma chose to remain an emigre in the United Kingdom, where he died at Penley near Wrexham in 1962. He was initially buried at Wrexham Cemetery but in July 2004 his remains and those of his brother Władysław were moved to Powązki Cemetery in Warsaw.

He is an uncle of Andrzej Czuma, Polish politician.

Military awards
He received several of the highest military awards of the Allied countries, including:

 Polish Virtuti Militari (3rd, 4th and 5th class)
 Polish Cross of Independence with Swords
 Cross of Valour (four times)
 Polonia Restituta (4th class)
 Gold Cross of Merit
 Commander of the Légion d'honneur (France)
 Grand Cross of Leopold (Belgium)

References 

1890 births
1962 deaths
People from Wieliczka County
People from the Kingdom of Galicia and Lodomeria
Polish Austro-Hungarians
Polish generals
Polish Rifle Squads members
Polish military personnel of World War II
Polish anti-communists
World War II prisoners of war held by Germany
Knights of the Virtuti Militari
Recipients of the Cross of Independence with Swords
Commandeurs of the Légion d'honneur
Recipients of the Cross of Valour (Poland)
Officers of the Order of Polonia Restituta
Recipients of the Gold Cross of Merit (Poland)
Polish prisoners of war
Burials at Powązki Military Cemetery